Floyd Bixler McKissick (March 9, 1922 – April 28, 1991) was an American lawyer and civil rights activist. He became the first African-American student at the University of North Carolina School of Law. In 1966 he became leader of CORE, the Congress of Racial Equality, taking over from James Farmer. A supporter of Black Power, he turned CORE into a more radical movement. In 1968, McKissick left CORE to found Soul City in Warren County, North Carolina. He endorsed Richard Nixon for president that year, and the federal government, under President Nixon, supported Soul City. He became a state district court judge in 1990 and died on April 28, 1991. He was a member of Alpha Phi Alpha fraternity.

Politician and attorney Floyd McKissick Jr., is his son.

Early life and education
Floyd Bixler McKissick Sr. was born in Asheville, North Carolina, the son of Ernest Boyce and Magnolia Thompson McKissick. His participation with civil rights began with his NAACP membership at the age of 12. As a 13-year-old Boy Scout helping to direct traffic during a roller-skating tournament in his hometown, McKissick was pushed to the ground by a white police officer; this incident secured his involvement in civil rights. McKissick states, "I've been active in North Carolina politics I think since I was about sixteen or seventeen, in high school." One of his early protests was in his hometown, Asheville, NC, because the city refused to permit actor Paul Robeson to speak in the city auditorium in the 1930s. He graduated from high school in 1939, and in 1940 went to Atlanta to attend Morehouse College. 
After enrolling at Morehouse, McKissick joined the U.S. Army and during World War II he served in the European Theater as a sergeant. After the war, he returned to Morehouse College where he graduated in 1948.

Early protest and political involvement
McKissick was involved with an early freedom ride that confronted racial segregation in interstate transportation in the 1947 Journey of Reconciliation.  He was the president of the Atlanta University chapter of the Progressive Party during his time at Morehouse College, a participant in voter registration, and also a supporter of Henry Wallace's 1948 presidential campaign.

In 1957, McKissick along with Nathan White Sr. headed The Durham Committee on Negro Affairs' Economic Committee, developed plans to boycott the Royal Ice Cream Parlor in Durham, NC.  Under the leadership of McKissick, twenty high school NAACP members acted in regular pickets outside of the Royal Ice Cream Parlor.

Admittance to UNC Law School
After graduating from Morehouse in 1948, McKissick decided to pursue a career in law. He returned to his native state North Carolina, and applied to the University of North Carolina (UNC) School of Law. He was subsequently denied admission because of his race. After his denial, he enrolled in North Carolina College (NCC) School of Law, now North Carolina Central University (NCCU), in Durham, North Carolina, which was the law school for blacks. While in NCC's Law School, the NAACP accepted McKissick's case, and filed a lawsuit against UNC School of Law. Thurgood Marshall led the NAACP defense. In 1951, a ruling by the United States Court of Appeals allowed McKissick and three other students admission to UNC's School of Law. At the time of the ruling, McKissick had nearly finished his law degree from NCC, but he took courses at UNC School of Law during the summer of 1951.  McKissick was in the first group of black students to be admitted at UNC School of Law.

Law efforts
In 1955, McKissick established a law firm in Durham, NC. His law firm was involved with civil rights issues and his clients included the first black undergraduates to attend UNC-Chapel Hill in 1955. He successfully defended sit-in protesters of the Durham's Royal Ice Cream Parlor in 1957, and the families who integrated Durham's city school system in 1959. The lead plaintiffs in the 1959 school desegregation case were his daughter, Joycelyn, and his wife, Evelyn.
As a lawyer, McKissick's most publicized efforts involved a segregated black local in the Tobacco Workers International, an AFL-CIO member. McKissick pressed to have black workers admitted to the skilled scale without loss of their seniority rating.

Involvement with CORE

After the Greensboro sit-in at Woolworth's lunch counter on February 1, 1960, Gordon Carey and James T. McCain, CORE (Congress of Racial Equality) field secretaries,  were sent to the Carolinas to help with the negotiating of department store owners and to spark interest in more sit-ins.  Carey was introduced to McKissick during this time.  "Carey helped McKissick and students organize the demonstrations that broke out on February 8th in Durham, and in the course of the next few weeks the two men travelled over the state setting up non-violent workshops."  McKissick handled legal affairs for both the NAACP and CORE, but he withdrew from the NAACP.  After leaving the NAACP and showing loyalty to CORE, he was elected to the CORE national chairmanship at the 1963 Convention.

When Floyd McKissick replaced James Farmer as head of CORE on January 3, 1966, the organization completed a 180-degree turn that saw it change from an interracial integrationist civil rights agency pledged to uphold nonviolence into a militant and uncompromising advocate of the ideology of black power.

In 1966, James Meredith challenged America's social system of poverty, racial segregation, and white supremacy by vowing to walk alone from Memphis, Tennessee to Jackson, Mississippi.  McKissick who had recently been elected head of CORE, promised to support Meredith in his journey.  Along with Martin Luther King Jr. and Stokely Carmichael, McKissick assisted in leading a group of demonstrators the remaining 194 miles to Jackson, Mississippi. McKissick states, "We issued the call to bring all the organizations together to continue the march at the spot where he fell."

McKissick and Roy Innis, who at that time was the head of the Harlem chapter of CORE, appeared to be close allies, but there were underlying tensions. When McKissick left CORE in 1968, Innis took over.

Soul City

After leaving CORE, McKissick launched a plan to build a new community, Soul City, in Warren County, North Carolina, on 500 acres of farmland. McKissick stated," Soul City was an idea before the movement. Soul City actually started after World War II, in my mind. And it was first talked about when we saw the use of the Marshall Plan, and all like that. See, I've always been in real estate and I've always been a businessman."
Soul City was supposed to reverse out-migration of minorities and the poor to urban areas. Soul City was a town intended for all, but placed emphasis on providing opportunities for minorities and the poor.

The venture received a $14 million bond issue guarantee from the Department of Housing and Urban Development through the New Communities Act of 1970 and a loan of $500,000 form the First Pennsylvania Bank.  The state of North Carolina also gave $1.7 million and private donors gave about $1 million.  With this funding, McKissick  built a state-of-the art water system, a health care clinic, and a massive steel-and-glass factory named Soultech I. Soul City was projected to have 24,000 jobs and 44,000 inhabitants by the year 2004. 
 
Soul City, however, ran into difficulties and the project never developed as McKissick had hoped. In June 1980, the Soul City Corporation and the federal government reached an agreement that allowed the government to assume control the following January. Under the agreement, the company retained 88 acres of the project, including the site of a mobile home park and a 60,000-square-foot building that had served as the project's headquarters.
 
The Department of Housing & Urban Development paid off $10 million in loans and agreed to pay an additional $175,000 of the project's debts.  In exchange, McKissick agreed to drop a lawsuit brought to block HUD from shutting down the project.

Later life and death
In June 1990, Floyd McKissick was appointed a state district court judge in the Ninth Judicial District in North Carolina, by Republican Governor James G. Martin. Less than a year after being appointed, while also working as pastor of the First Baptist Church of Soul City, McKissick died of lung cancer at the age 69 on Sunday April 28, 1991.  He was buried in Soul City.  He was survived by his wife, the former Evelyn Williams, whom he married in 1942; a son, Floyd McKissick, Jr; and three daughters, Joycelyn, Andree, and Charmaine.

References

External links
 Inventory of the Floyd B. McKissick Papers, 1940s-1980s, in the Southern Historical Collection, UNC-Chapel Hill
 CORE History
 King Encyclopedia
Harambee City: Archival site incorporating documents, maps, audio/visual materials related to CORE's work in black power and black economic development.

North Carolina lawyers
African-American judges
American civil rights activists
United States Army personnel of World War II
North Carolina state court judges
1991 deaths
1922 births
20th-century American lawyers
20th-century American judges
United States Army soldiers
People from Asheville, North Carolina
20th-century African-American people